Kevin Deltombe (born 27 February 1994) is a Belgian cyclist, who most recently rode for UCI ProTeam .

Major results
2011
 1st Stage 1 Tour du Valromey
2012
 1st Stage 1 Trofeo Karlsberg
 1st Stage 1 Oberösterreich Juniorenrundfahrt
2014
 3rd Grand Prix Criquielion
2016
 4th Paris–Tours Espoirs
 9th Dwars door de Vlaamse Ardennen 
 9th Grand Prix de la Ville de Lillers Souvenir Bruno Comini 
2018
 5th Grand Prix of Aargau Canton
 7th GP Stad Zottegem 
2019
 8th Volta Limburg Classic

References

External links

1994 births
Living people
Belgian male cyclists
Sportspeople from Bruges
Cyclists from West Flanders
21st-century Belgian people